Butler County High School is a four-year public high school in Morgantown, Kentucky, United States.  The principal is Stoye Young.

History
The school was established in 1952 following the consolidation of the county's rural high schools prior to the 1952-53 academic year.

Athletics 
The Butler County High School athletic teams are known as the Bears. The school colors are blue and white. All teams compete under the authority of the KHSAA.

The boys and girls basketball teams compete in a division that includes Edmonson County, Whitesville Trinity, Grayson County High School basketball teams. The football team competes in the KHSAA at the class 3A level, with Edmonson County and Grayson County High Schools serving as the main rivals.

All of Butler County High School's football, baseball, softball, and basketball events are broadcast by locally based radio station WLBQ, which broadcasts at 1570 AM and on 101.5 and 103.5 FM via translators W268CE and W278DA, respectively.

Band 
The marching band competes around the state at KMEA sanction competitions (the Marching Band is classified as Class 2A) each year starting from August and ending in October. The band's main rivalry is with the Edmonson County High School Marching Band. The band performs at football games for halftime entertainment. The band also plays at Basketball games and or any district/state tournaments.

Notable alumni
 Keith Butler - baseball pitcher, St. Louis Cardinals

References

External links

Schools in Butler County, Kentucky
Public high schools in Kentucky
Morgantown, Kentucky
Education in Butler County, Kentucky